is a 1993 vertical scrolling shooter arcade game that was developed by Seibu Kaihatsu. It was the second game in the Raiden series of vertical scrolling shooter arcade games that started with Raiden.

Raiden II was ported to Windows by Kinesoft and Microsoft Corporation. The Windows version uses Red Book audio for music. This game and the original Raiden were released for the PlayStation as The Raiden Project.

Gameplay

This game expands on the first Raiden'''s mechanics, introducing two weapons: the Bend Plasma, a lock-on weapon that deals constant low damage to enemies, and the Cluster Bomb, a fast-deploying bomb that does less damage than regular bombs but strikes a larger area.Raiden II has three primary weapons and two missile weapons, upgraded by collecting power-ups. Primary weapons and missiles are fired simultaneously. Bombs are special weapons that deal damage over a wide area and cancel out enemy fire. Players can carry a maximum of seven of any combination of the two types of bombs in the game.

The player fights enemies through eight stages of increasing difficulty. In a two-player game, when one player shoots the other's craft with the red or blue primary weapon, the other player's craft generates special projectiles that deal a lot of damage to enemies.

Plot
The game's story continues where the first game left off. Three years after the VCD repelled the invasion of the Crystals, the remnants of the machines controlled by the Crystals regroup to form another army to resume taking over the Earth. To combat this Crystal resurgence, a new weapon is developed for the Fighting Thunder—designed from Crystal technology—to stop the Crystals again.

Raiden DX
 is an alternate version of Raiden II. It has three different game modes: a 15-minute long unbroken stage that does not allow players to continue, the first five stages of Raiden II, and eight stages (plus one bonus) with new layouts. Raiden DX was ported to the PlayStation in Japan. This version includes a PS-exclusive soundtrack, the Viper Phase 1 soundtrack, the arcade original soundtrack, The Master of Raiden, encyclopedia, and other features. The PlayStation version was re-released by Hamster Corporation in 2000.

 Reception 
In Japan, Game Machine listed Raiden II on their February 1, 1994 issue as being the most-successful table arcade unit at the time. In North America, RePlay reported Raiden II to be the second most-popular arcade game at the time. Game Machine also listed Raiden DX on their September 15, 1994 issue as being the fifth most-successful table arcade unit at the time. RePlay also reported Raiden DX to be the fifth most-popular arcade game at the time. Play Meter listed Raiden II'' to be the thirty-sixth most-popular arcade game at the time.

References

External links

Raiden II at Gamebank via Internet Archive
Raiden II at CyberFront via Internet Archive
Raiden DX at Hamster Corporation

1993 video games
Arcade video games
Fabtek games
Kinesoft games
NuFX games
PlayStation (console) games
Seibu Kaihatsu games
Vertically scrolling shooters
Video games developed in Japan
Windows games
Vertically-oriented video games
Multiplayer and single-player video games
Cooperative video games
Hamster Corporation games